The New London riots of 1919 were a series of racial riots between white and black Navy sailors and Marines stationed in New London and Groton, Connecticut.

Race violence
White and black sailors and marines occupied separate living quarters at the Naval submarine base in Groton, Connecticut in 1919. Racial tensions were high in the Groton and New London area from May to June, and there were several confrontations between the two groups. Black sailors reported that white sailors attacked them, and white Marines accused the black sailors of waiting for them after dark when they crossed Long Cove Bridge. The police arrested two white "Blue Jackets", and white sailors attacked the Hotel Bristol on Bank Street where the black sailors spent most of their free time, throwing a group of blacks out of the hotel on the street and beating them. The police and fire brigades were called but could not stop the rioting. The Marine Corps were eventually called, and they regained control.

On May 30, 1919, about 20 sailors and soldiers were arrested by police officers, marines, and firemen. The Greeneville Daily Sun reported that the trouble began when "negro sailors" entered the Coast Guard Academy in New London and attacked white sailors. On June 29, 1919, another riot erupted which required the Marines to restore order. Author Jan Voogd argues that this riot came to national attention because a fire hydrant was damaged by the marine vehicles. This caused a dispute between the submarine base and city authorities over who would pay for the damage, and so created a paper trail. Voogd posits that there may have been other race riots that went "uncounted, unobserved, and unacknowledged."

Aftermath

These confrontations were among numerous incidents of civil unrest that began in the so-called Red Summer of 1919. The Summer consisted of attacks on black communities in more than three dozen cities and counties. In most cases, white mobs attacked black neighborhoods. In some cases, black community groups resisted the attacks, especially in Chicago and Washington, D.C. Most deaths occurred in rural areas during events such as the Elaine Race Riot in Arkansas, where an estimated 100 to 240 black people and 5 white people were killed. Also occurring in 1919 were the Chicago Race Riot and Washington D.C. race riot which killed 38 and 39 people respectively, both having many more non-fatal injuries and extensive property damage.

See also
Washington race riot of 1919
Mass racial violence in the United States
List of incidents of civil unrest in the United States

Bibliography 
Notes

References  

    
 - Total pages: 930 
 
 - Total pages: 234 

1919 in Connecticut
1919 in military history
1919 riots in the United States
May 1919 events
June 1919 events
United States Marine Corps in the 20th century
United States Navy in the 20th century
African-American history between emancipation and the civil rights movement
History of racism in Connecticut
History of the United States Coast Guard
Racially motivated violence against African Americans
Red Summer
Riots and civil disorder in Connecticut
White American riots in the United States